Anselme-Homère Pâquet (29 September 1830 – 22 December 1891) was a Canadian physician, professor and parliamentarian.  He served three terms as a Liberal Member of Parliament in the House of Commons of Canada representing the Quebec riding of Berthier.

He was born Michel-Anselme Pâquet in Saint-Cuthbert, Lower Canada in 1830. He studied at the Montreal School of Medicine and Surgery, qualified as a physician in 1853 and opened a practice in Saint-Cuthbert. By 1854, he had adopted the name Anselme-Homère. He was elected to the Legislative Assembly of the Province of Canada in 1863 for Berthier and served until Confederation. He opposed confederation. He was  elected in the Canadian federal election of 1867, and was re-elected in 1872 and 1874. He resigned his seat in the House of Commons to accept an appointment to the Senate of Canada on 9 February 1875 on the recommendation of Alexander Mackenzie. He served in this capacity, representing the senatorial division of De la Vallière, Quebec, until his death in 1891. Pâquet also taught clinical medicine at the Hôtel-Dieu de Montréal and hygiene and public health at the Montreal School of Medicine.

References 
 
 
 

1830 births
1891 deaths
Physicians from Quebec
Canadian senators from Quebec
Liberal Party of Canada MPs
Liberal Party of Canada senators
Members of the House of Commons of Canada from Quebec
Members of the Legislative Assembly of the Province of Canada from Canada East